Lee Tien-yu (born May 23, 1946) is a retired ROC Air Force general and former defense minister of the Republic of China (Taiwan). He took office after the new premier, Chang, was inaugurated.

References

1946 births
Living people
Politicians from Zibo
Republic of China Air Force personnel
Kuomintang politicians in Taiwan
Republic of China politicians from Shandong
Taiwanese Ministers of National Defense
Recipients of the Order of Blue Sky and White Sun
Taiwanese people from Shandong